A list of Phi Kappa Sigma chapters

Active Chapters 

Beta, Princeton University
Zeta, Franklin & Marshall College
Mu, Tulane University
Omicron, University of Oklahoma
Sigma, University of Texas-Austin
Psi, Pennsylvania State University
Alpha Beta, University of Toronto
Alpha Delta, University of Maine
Alpha Epsilon, Illinois Institute of Technology
Alpha Eta, University of South Carolina
Alpha Theta, University of Wisconsin–Madison
Alpha Kappa, University of Alabama
Alpha Lambda, University of California, Berkeley
Alpha Mu, Massachusetts Institute of Technology
Alpha Nu, Georgia Institute of Technology
Alpha Xi, Purdue University
Alpha Upsilon, University of Washington
Alpha Psi, University of California, Los Angeles     
Beta Delta, Michigan State University
Beta Theta, Texas Christian University
Beta Lambda, Northern Illinois University
Beta Mu, University of South Alabama
Beta Rho, University of California, Riverside
Beta Xi, University of New Orleans    
Beta Chi, Clarkson University
Beta Psi, Washington State University 
Beta Omega, Radford University
Gamma Gamma, Carthage College
Gamma Mu, Texas State University
Gamma Xi, George Mason University
Gamma Sigma, Rutgers University
Gamma Upsilon, UMASS Lowell
Delta Gamma, Rowan University 
Delta Eta, McDaniel College
Delta Omicron, Ramapo College
Delta Rho, Ursinus College
Delta Sigma, University of Maryland, Baltimore County (UMBC)
Epsilon Alpha, Tarleton State University
Epsilon Beta, Oklahoma State University
Epsilon Gamma, University of Delaware

Current Expansion and Returns 

Rho, University of Illinois
Alpha Gamma, West Virginia University
Alpha Sigma, University of Minnesota
Alpha Omega, University of British Columbia
Beta Eta, University of North Texas
Beta Omicron, Virginia Polytechnic Institute
Gamma Delta, Texas A&M
University of Colorado - Boulder
Iowa State University

Inactive Chapters 
Alpha, University of Pennsylvania
Gamma, Lafayette College
Delta, Washington & Jefferson College
Epsilon, Dickinson College
Eta, University of Virginia
Theta, Kenyon College
Theta, Centenary College
Iota, Columbia University
Kappa, Emory & Henry College
Kappa, Lake Forest College
Kappa, Dartmouth College
Lambda, UNC-Chapel Hill
Nu, Cumberland University
Nu, Duke University
Xi, University of Mississippi
Omicron, Centre College
Omicron, University of Oklahoma
Pi, Harvard University
Rho, Austin College
Sigma, Lehigh University
Tau, Randolph-Macon College
Upsilon, Northwestern University
Phi, University of Richmond
Chi, Racine College, not a college since 1935
Psi, Long Island University
Omega, Haverford College
Alpha Alpha, Washington & Lee University
Alpha Iota, Vanderbilt University
Alpha Omicron, University of Michigan
Alpha Pi, University of Chicago
Alpha Rho, Cornell University
Alpha Tau, Stanford University
Alpha Phi, University of Iowa
Alpha Chi, Ohio State University
Alpha Zeta, University of Maryland
Beta Alpha, University of Oregon
Beta Beta, University of Kansas
Beta Gamma, University of Denver
Beta Epsilon, Oregon State University
Beta Zeta, Ohio University
Beta Iota, St. Lawrence University
Beta Kappa, Drury College
Beta Nu, Adrian College 
Beta Pi, Louisiana Tech University
Beta Sigma, Salisbury State University
Beta Tau, Towson University
Beta Upsilon, SUNY Potsdam
Beta Phi, SUNY Geneseo
Gamma Alpha, SUNY-Buffalo
Gamma Beta, Drexel University
Gamma Epsilon Seton Hall University
Gamma Zeta, California University of Pennsylvania
Gamma Eta, SUNY Fredonia
Gamma Theta: West Chester University of Pennsylvania
Gamma Iota, Millersville University
Gamma Kappa, SUNY Oneonta
Gamma Lambda, UNC Charlotte
Gamma Nu, SUNY Albany
Gamma Omicron, Rutgers–Camden
Gamma Pi, Wesley College
Gamma Rho, Bryant College
Gamma Tau, University of New Hampshire
Gamma Phi, St. Leo University
Gamma Chi, Ithaca College
Gamma Psi, Johnson & Wales University
Gamma Omega, University of Southern Maine
Delta Alpha, Kutztown University
Delta Beta, UMASS Amherst
Delta Delta, Florida International University
Delta Epsilon colony, Shenandoah University
Delta Zeta colony, University of Colorado at Colorado Springs
Delta Theta colony, Western New England College
Delta Iota, Marist College
Delta Kappa colony, Marshall University
Delta Lambda, Niagara University
Delta Mu, Mansfield University
Delta Nu, King's College
Delta Xi, Edinboro University of Pennsylvania
Delta Pi, Indiana University
Delta Tau, DePaul University
Delta Upsilon, Virginia Commonwealth University
Delta Phi, New York University
Delta Chi, Queens University of Charlotte
Delta Psi, Temple University
Delta Omega, University of Hartford

See also 
Phi Kappa Sigma main article

References

Lists of chapters of United States student societies by society
chapters